The Citroën Fukang or Dongfeng Fukang is a series of compact vehicles available in a variety of body styles. It was the first in a range of cars produced for the Chinese market by the Dongfeng Peugeot-Citroën Automobile group, a joint venture between the French PSA Peugeot Citroën and Chinese manufacturer Dongfeng Motor Corporation.

Overview

The first Fukang appeared in 1992 as a semi-knock down production, rebadged Citroën ZX hatchback. The car was called the Fukang DC7140 in China, the name translating as ‘Prosperity and Health’ in Chinese. Later on, the DC7160 with a fuel-injected 1.6 liter engine was added to the lineup. 17,000 of the SKD ZXs were built until late 1996, when Dongfeng's own two plants in Wuhan province became up to speed and local production commenced. Local capacity was 150,000 per annum. 

Two years later, the first of a number of special Chinese market Citroën models was launched when the Citroën Fukang 988 arrived. Presented in September 1998, this was a saloon version of the Fukang DC7160 and originally featured the larger 1.6 litre, fuel-injected engine. The saloon Fukang was developed by specialist engineering firm Heuliez, who also developed a long wheelbase limousine version called the Fukang 988 VIP.  

The saloon versions continued until 2003, when they were replaced by an updated version of the theme, the Citroën Elysée. However, the hatchback Fukang continued to be part of the Chinese Citroën range until 2009. 

On February 26, 2009, the new facelifted Citroën C-Elysée hatchback finally replaced the Fukang. These models had also been joined in 2006 by the Citroën Xsara, Picasso, and the C-Triomphe. The Fukang was also available in the form of a 4-door pickup truck and a 2-door panel van.

Awards 
 In 2005, the Fukang was voted 'China's Best Value car' by Sina Automobile News, China Youth Today and Beijing Modern Business News.

Reuse of the Fukang name
The Fukang name was later reused by Shenlong Motors, a joint venture company jointly funded by Dongfeng Motor and PSA Group in 1992. The joint venture launched products sold under the Dongfeng Fukang brand including the Fukang ES500, Fukang ES600 and Citroën E-Elysée (electric Citroën C-Elysée).

References

External links
 Dong Feng-Peugeot-Citroën Automobile
 Dong Feng Fukang at Citroenet

Fukang
Dongfeng vehicles
Cars of China